S6000 may refer to :
 Akai S6000
 FinePix S6000fd, a digital camera by Fujifilm
 Compaq Presario S6000CL, a Compaq Presario desktop computer